Mercator Limited is an Indian company. It was earlier known as Mercator Lines Ltd. The Mercator group of companies has diversified business interests in Coal, Oil & Gas, Commodity Transportation, and Dredging. Mercator Limited (formerly Mercator Lines Ltd.) is the parent company and was the second largest private sector shipping company in India, and it is based in Mumbai. It was amongst the highest wealth creators in the Indian stock exchanges between 2000 -2010. 

It suffered greatly after 2008 financial crises which led all commodities crashing along with the greatest and longest downturn in the Shipping Industry with the indexes crashing over 95% from its peak in 2008 to its lows in 2015. It also suffered greatly due it to its receivables stuck in litigation with several Government owned companies namely Dredging Corporation of India and ONGC. As per the companies disclosures the total litigation amount is around USD 300 million, more than its total debt at the time. Long legal battles along with severe downturn and bank's inability to roll over its due debts led it to the company's decline with eventual it being taken to NCLT for liquidation. 

Company was truly a pioneer in many ways challenging the way the Shipping business was done in India. It won many awards including Best Company by Business Standard and Economic Times in 2007 and 2008. Its founder and Chairman Mr Harish Kumar Mittal won the prestigious Entrepreneur of the Year Award from EY in 2007.

It was only the second Indian company to list its Singapore subsidiary on the Singapore Stock Exchange in Singapore in 2007. Mercator Lines (Singapore) Pte Ltd went on to win many corporate governance awards, only Indian company to do so.

Group Overview 

Mercator Ltd. was the second largest private sector shipping company in India in terms of tonnage till 2018.

Mercator Ltd was incorporated on 24 November 1983 as a private limited company. It was converted into a public limited company on 3 April 1984.

It has done pioneering work by operating vessels in some uncharted rivers like the Tapti and has thus opened new navigational routes. It has diversified itself into various business segments.

Mr. H. K. Mittal the promoter of the company took it over in the year 1988 and the company has become the second largest private sector shipping company in India in terms of tonnage.

Since its maiden public issue in 1993, it has grown in terms of financial parameters like turnover, profits, tonnage and market capitalization. Presently the shares of the company are listed on Mumbai Stock Exchange and National Stock Exchange. During April 2005, the Company completed its first international offering of Foreign Currency Convertible Bonds aggregating US$60 mn. The issue is listed on Singapore Stock Exchange.

The company also added new business segment namely offshore drilling with acquisition of Jack-Up Rig. The rig received ahead of its schedule; was deployed immediately upon delivery in March 2009; for a period of three years on firm bare boat charter. The group has opted out of the offshore drilling segment w.e.f. March 2011 as strategic decision.

The company also forayed into dredging and presently owns a sizeable fleet.

Mercator Group has also acquired economic interest in coal mines in Mozambique and Indonesia with substantial coal resources; as a measure of backward integration to strengthen its shipping activities and to meet the huge energy demand in India. The commercial operations in Indonesia have already commenced.

Tankers 

Mercator commenced its Wet Bulk business in 1998 by acquiring the vessel M. T. Richa (9,750 DWT) and entered into crude oil transportation in 2003. In a very short span of time, it has grown to be amongst the major Indian companies in this segment. Mercator is the second largest tanker owners in the private sector in India in terms of tonnage. The company operates its fleet as a mix of spot contracts (single-voyage) and period contracts (fixed-term). The Company presently has a consolidated DWT of 760,189 tones for this segment.

In addition to its usage for transportation of cargo, tankers can also be used as offshore storage facilities. The company has one such modern Aframax tanker on a long-term period contract.

Mercator also is the first Indian company to have its complete Tanker fleet of double hull.

Dry Bulk Carriers 

Mercator's Dry Bulk shipping business is handled through its Singapore listed subsidiary, Mercator Lines (Singapore) Limited (MLS). Commencing operations in 2005, it has established a market presence in the Indian coal transport market, specializing in the transportation of dry bulk commodities, such as coal into India from Australia and Indonesia; and iron ore from India to countries such as China.

Mercator's network strength in the Indian markets helps maximize the capacity usage efficiencies by utilizing its ships on the triangular route of Indonesia – India – China – Indonesia.

Mercator also provides its customers with shipping. The Group primarily services large thermal-based power plants and steel companies, and has established strong relationships with reputed end-user customers such as Vale, Tata Power, Arcelor Mittal Group, and COSCO to name a few.

MLS presently controls an operating fleet of 18 vessels including a VLOC, which is the largest bulk carrier in India and Singapore.

Coal & Logistics 

Mercator Ltd has been in business of Coal transportation & Logistics since 1995 & served many Thermal Power Station in India.

Mercator Ltd entered into coal business in 2008 as backward integration.  Coal business includes Coal Mining, Coal Trading, Handling & shipping

Mercator Ltd acquired coal mines in Indonesia with substantial coal resources, as a measure of backward integration.

Mercator also provides shipping in India.

Oil & Gas 

Mercator first forayed into the Oil & Gas business in 2004, when it chartered a Floating Storage and Offloading (FSO) Unit to BG Group. Since then, the oil & gas division has seen a steady growth with the most recent achievement being the Sagar Samrat Conversion COMPANY Project for ONGC.  Floating Storage and Offloading (FSO) Units and a Mobile Offshore Production Unit (MOPU) in Nigeria, the Oil & Gas vertical has proved itself as a strategic component of Mercator's philosophy of diversified growth.

Company placed the order for a Jack Up Rig in November 2007 with Keppel FELLS Ltd which was delivered in 2009 & was immediately contracted to one of private sector shipping company in India.  The Group has opted out of the Offshore Drilling segment wef March 2011 as strategic decision.

Floating Production Unit (MOPU + FSO) 

In 2010, Mercator won a contract for Charter of a Floating Production Unit (FPU), which is a combination of a MOPU and an FSO, from Afren Plc., a UK listed Company, with worldwide operations in oil exploration. To execute this, Mercator provided Engineering, Procurement, Construction, Installation and Commissioning (EPCIC) services successfully at an oil field in Nigeria, with the services customized as per the requirements of the Charterer. This project was executed in 432 days, working around the clock and coordinating the project from various parts of the world. Mercator is currently operating the FPU at the Ebok field in Nigeria.

Sagar Samrat 

On 17 November 2011, a consortium of Mercator and Gulf Piping Company, Abu Dhabi was awarded an EPC contract by ONGC for conversion of their Mobile Offshore Drilling Unit ("MODU") 'Sagar Samrat' into Mobile Offshore Production Unit ("MOPU"). The detailed engineering design is by GL Noble Denton, UAE, for Marine Part and Samsung Heavy Industries India Pvt. Ltd (SHI-I) for Production Facility. It is purely Indian and the infrastructure of the mill is on the Indian Rupee 1 note.

Dredging 

Mercator forayed into dredging in the year 2007. Currently, it holds the following fleet:

1) Six trailing suction hopper dredgers;
2) One grab cum trailing suction hopper dredger;
3) One cutter suction dredger;
4) One bucket ladder dredger.

It is one of the principal clients for major ports like Paradip, New Mangalore, Kandla, as well as the Indian Navy.

References

External links
 Mercator Limited
 Mercator Lines (Singapore) Limited

Transport companies established in 1983
Shipping companies of India
Companies based in Mumbai
Indian companies established in 1983
1983 establishments in Maharashtra
Companies listed on the National Stock Exchange of India
Companies listed on the Bombay Stock Exchange